KDRX (106.9 FM) is a radio station licensed to serve Laughlin Air Force Base, Texas, United States. The station airs a country music format and serves the Del Rio, Texas area. KDRX is currently owned by MBM Radio Del Rio, LLC.

History 
On June 18, 2009, the station was sold to Frequency Collaboration Corp. Effective June 15, 2012, the station was sold to MBM Radio Del Rio, LLC, a subsidiary of R Communications.

References

External links
Outlaw 106.9 Facebook

DRX